The leather pride flag is a symbol used by the leather subculture since the 1990s. It was designed by Tony DeBlase, and was quickly embraced by the gay leather community. It has since become associated with leather in general and also with related groups such as the BDSM community.

History

The flag was designed by Tony DeBlase. He first presented the design at International Mister Leather on May 28, 1989.

Initial reaction to the flag was mixed. According to DeBlase's article A Leather Pride Flag,
Some, particularly on the east coast, reacted positively to the concept, but were quite concerned, some even offended, that I had not involved the community in helping to create the design.

In June 1989, the flag was used by the leather contingent in a Portland, Oregon pride parade, which was its first appearance at a pride parade.

On September 18, 1990, Clive Platman (Mr. Australia Drummer) presented Tony DeBlase with an Australian version of the flag, incorporating the southern cross, which is from the Australian national flag, with the original design of the leather pride flag.

On October 11, 1991, at the opening ceremonies of Living in Leather, a Canadian version of the leather pride flag was presented, which added to the original flag's design a row of red maple leaves running horizontally through the white stripe.

Also in 1991, Melbourne Leather Men became the first club to incorporate the design elements of the leather pride flag into their club colors.

On December 12, 2000, NLA Florida presented a suggested pledge of allegiance to the leather pride flag at its holiday party in Fort Lauderdale, which reads, "I pledge allegiance to the Leather Pride flag, and the union of Leather people for which it stands, with safety, sanity and consent for all."

For the 24th annual Folsom Street Fair, held September 30, 2007, the official poster artwork was a controversial photo featuring well-known LGBT and BDSM community members in festive and fetish attire including Sister Roma "as players in an innovative version of the culturally iconographic" The Last Supper by Leonardo da Vinci, complete with table draped with the leather pride flag and "cluttered with sex toys, whips, and various (BDSM) restraints". The image by FredAlert was used on the official event guide and produced as collector's posters that were displayed throughout the city as advertising for the event.

In 2010 the leather pride flag's creator Tony DeBlase was inducted into the Leather Hall of Fame.

Leather & Grace, a former organization of Unitarian Universalists who identified with the BDSM/kink community, was founded in 2011 by Desmond Ravenstone. Their logo combined a red flaming chalice with the stripes of the leather pride flag.

The San Francisco South of Market Leather History Alley consists of four works of art along Ringold Alley honoring leather culture; it opened in 2017. The four works of art are: engraved standing stones that honor community leather institutions including the Folsom Street Fair and leather pride flag pavement markings through which the stones emerge, a black granite stone etched with a narrative by Gayle Rubin, an image of the "Leather David" statue by Mike Caffee, and with a reproduction of Chuck Arnett’s 1962 mural that was in the Tool Box (a gay leather bar), and metal bootprints along the curb which honor 28 people (including Tony DeBlase, creator of the leather pride flag) who were an important part of the leather communities of San Francisco.

One of three original leather pride flags which the flag's creator Tony DeBlase assembled as a prototype was donated to the Leather Archives & Museum. The Leather Archives & Museum also holds the papers of DeBlase.

Design
Creator DeBlase gave this explanation of the design:
The flag is composed of nine horizontal stripes of equal width. From the top and from the bottom, the stripes alternate black and royal blue. The central stripe is white. In the upper left quadrant of the flag is a large red heart. I will leave it to the viewer to interpret the colors and symbols.

Popularity

Although the flag is common in the gay leather community, it is not an exclusively gay symbol and represents the entire leather community.

Furthermore, while designed as a symbol for the leather subculture, it is also widely used within the entire BDSM (bondage & discipline, dominance and submission, sadomasochism) subculture.

Variations and inspiration for other flags
Although Tony DeBlase is quoted as saying the design of the leather pride flag, which he created, is copyrighted in the U.S. (as well as all countries where the Berne Convention standards apply), copyright is automatic, and need not be obtained through official registration with any government office. Once an idea has been produced as a tangible form, for example by securing it in a fixed medium (such as a drawing, sheet music, photograph, a videotape, or a computer file), the copyright holder is entitled to enforce their exclusive rights.

Nevertheless, variations on the original leather pride flag have been created. On September 18, 1990, Clive Platman (Mr. Australia Drummer) presented the original leather pride flag's creator DeBlase with an Australian version of the flag, incorporating the southern cross, which is from the Australian national flag, with the original design of the leather pride flag. On October 11, 1991, at the opening ceremonies of Living in Leather, a Canadian version of the leather pride flag was presented, which added to the original flag's design a row of red maple leaves running horizontally through the white stripe.

Leather & Grace, a (now defunct) organization of Unitarian Universalist kinksters, founded in 2011, combined a red flaming chalice with the stripes of the leather pride flag for their logo.

The BDSM rights flag, designed by Tanos, a Master from the United Kingdom, is partially loosely based on the design of the leather pride flag and also includes a version of the BDSM Emblem (but not similar enough to fall within Quagmyr's specific copyright claims for the Emblem). The BDSM rights flag is intended to represent the belief that people whose sexuality or relationship preferences include BDSM practices deserve the same human rights as everyone else, and should not be discriminated against for pursuing BDSM with consenting adults.

See also

 Bisexual flag
 Rainbow flag
 Transgender flag

References

External links

BDSM
Flags introduced in 1989
Leather subculture
Sexuality flags
LGBT flags